Aast is a commune in the Pyrénées-Atlantiques department in the Nouvelle-Aquitaine region in southwestern France.

The inhabitants are known as Aastais.

Geography

Location
The village is situated on the plateau of Ger and is composed of a dozen scattered houses.  Aast is 20 km east of Pau and 20 km north of Lourdes. Access to the commune is by road D70 then D311 north-east from Gardères, road D64 north-west from Ger, and road D311 when coming south from Ponson-Dessus. Other country roads can also be used to access the commune.

Hydrography
Located in the Drainage basin of the Adour, Aast is traversed by the Carbouère stream, a tributary of the Louet river.

Localities and hamlets

 Aast
 Bayet
 Bidou
 Cadet
 France
 Gachau
 Hourcade
 Lasbordes
 Lasserre
 Lassus
 Lescloupe
 Mouly
 Pouquet
 Rémy
 Toulou

Neighbouring communes and villages

Toponymy
Aast is the first French commune in alphabetical order. Previously, Aas, another commune in the Lower Pyrenees, came first until 1861, when it merged with the commune of Assouste to form the new commune of Eaux-Bonnes.

The commune's Béarnais name is also Aast.

According to Dauzat and Rostaing Aast comes from the Basque ast ("rock"). This seems unlikely given the physical setting. Michel Grosclaude suggests that the name of the town derives from an anthroponym composed of Aner + Aster. Brigitte Jobbé-Duval recalls that in 1429, Aast appeared as Hast, which means lance, and therefore advanced the theory that Aast could refer to a battle that occurred there.

The following table details the origins of the commune name.

Sources:

Raymond: Topographic Dictionary of the Department of Basses-Pyrenees, 1863, on the page numbers indicated in the table. 
Cassini: Cassini Map from 1750

Origins:
Census: Census of Montaner
Reformation: Reformation of Béarn

History
There was a Lay Abbey in Aast which was abolished in 1791. The Lordship of Aast was owned by the Day family from 1674 until the French Revolution. In 1678, Jérome de Day, adviser to the king, bought the abbey and tithes with rights of patronage: he was to provide a priest and entitled to receive a portion of the tithe, to sit in the choir, to be first to receive the blessed bread, and to be buried in the church.

Heraldry

Administration
List of Successive Mayors of Aast

Mayors from 1942

Population

Culture and Heritage

Civil heritage
The town has a number of old farmhouses:
 The Fray Farmhouse (17th century)
A Farmhouse at Bayet (19th century)
Houses and Farms (18th and 19th century)

Religious Heritage

The Church of Saint Martin (1854) dedicated to Saint Martin of Tours was built under Napoleon III during the administration of Mayor Bartholomew Lassus. Recently renovated by the artist Villarubias, there are many objects in the church registered as historical objects:
A Processional Lantern (18th century)
A Thurible (17th century)
A Pail for holy water (19th century)
A Painting: Christ on the cross with the Virgin, Saint Madeleine and Saint Martin (18th century)
2 Paintings: Saint Martin Bishop, and the Charity of St. Martin (19th century)
Statue: Saint Joseph (19th century)
Altar Pulpit (19th century)
A Pulpit (18th century)
2 Altars and Tabernacles (19th century)
The Main Altar (19th century)
5 stained glass windows by Henri Gesta (1927)
The Furniture in the Church

See also
 Communes of the Pyrénées-Atlantiques department

References

External links
 Aast on the 1750 Cassini Map

Communes of Pyrénées-Atlantiques
Pyrénées-Atlantiques communes articles needing translation from French Wikipedia